This list contains all cultural property of national significance (class A) in the canton of Appenzell Innerrhoden from the 2009 Swiss Inventory of Cultural Property of National and Regional Significance. It is sorted by municipality.

The geographic coordinates provided are in the Swiss coordinate system as given in the Inventory.

Appenzell

Gonten

Schlatt-Haslen

Schwende-Rüte

References
 All entries, addresses and coordinates are from:

External links
 Swiss Inventory of Cultural Property of National and Regional Significance, 2009 edition:

PDF documents: Class B objects
Geographic information system